My Father the Genius is a 2002 documentary film directed by Lucia Small.

Synopsis
When long-estranged father, dreamer and visionary architect, Glen Small bequeaths his daughter the task of writing his biography, she answers instead with a film about his career and rocky private life - while he is still alive. My Father, The Genius explores the precarious framework on which a career and family are built. How does a man dedicate his entire life to "saving the world through architecture," yet miss some basics at home? How does one balance creative obsession with familial obligations?

References

External links

 

2002 films
American documentary films
Documentary films about architecture
2000s American films